Pietro Baccolo (born 21 June 1990) is an Italian professional footballer who plays for Clodiense as a midfielder.

Career
Born in Brescia, Lombardy, Baccolo started his career at Veneto side Padova.

Parma
In January 2010, he was signed by Serie A club Parma in co-ownership deal as part of the deal that Daniele Vantaggiato went to the opposite direction. The deal of Vantaggiato was the registration rights of Baccolo plus €1 million cash. Both club also retained the 50% registration rights. Half of Baccolo's rights was valued for €1.5 million and Vantaggiato for €2.5 million at that time,. made both club mutually had a selling profit despite transfer spending increased. However the transfer fee would amortize over the contract length instead (-year for Baccolo, €666,667 a year). Combined with the cost and profit, the transfer made both clubs had a positive net effect in the first season and followed by a negative effect (amortization) in the second year.

He wore no.16 of Parma's first team. However Baccolo was unable to prove his "market" value.

On 21 July 2010, he was loaned to South Tyrol. Parma also subsidized the South Tyrol-based side premi di valorizzazione €96,000.

In June 2011 both clubs gave up the remain 50% registration rights for free. However, that made Parma had a financial income for Baccolo (€1.5 million) and cost for Vantaggiato (€2.5 million)  and vice versa in Padova side.

In July 2011 he was loaned to Serie B club Frosinone along with Alessio Manzoni.

In July 2012 he was signed by Serie C1 club Gubbio in another temporary deal. Parma again subsidized Gubbio €200,000 as premi di valorizzazione. On 5 July 2013, the loan was renewed, with Gubbio also signed Cacchioli, Sarr and Tartaglia from Parma on the same day.

On 27 August 2014, he was signed by Paganese in temporary deal, re-joining Tartaglia. Paganese also signed Bussi, Caccavallo, Cancelloni and Deli from Parma. During his loans Baccolo also extended his contract with Parma, lasting until 30 June 2017.

On 1 October 2018, he joined Serie D club Clodiense.

Now he's playing for Luparense in Italian 4th Division.

References

External links
 FIGC 
 Football.it Profile 
 

1990 births
Footballers from Brescia
Living people
Italian footballers
Italy youth international footballers
Association football midfielders
Calcio Padova players
Parma Calcio 1913 players
F.C. Südtirol players
Frosinone Calcio players
A.S. Gubbio 1910 players
A.C.R. Messina players
U.S. Catanzaro 1929 players
Paganese Calcio 1926 players
Serie B players
Serie C players
Serie D players